CornerShot is a weapon accessory invented by Lt. Col. Amos Golan of the Israeli Defense Forces in cooperation with American investors. It was designed in the early 2000s for use by SWAT teams and special forces in hostile situations usually involving terrorists and hostages. Its purpose is similar to that of the periscope rifle; it allows its operator to both see and attack an armed target without exposing the operator to counterattack.

Forms and variations 
The CornerShot's shooting range is claimed to be accurate and effective to 100 meters with 9×19mm, .40 S&W, and .45 ACP pistols, and is claimed to be effective to 200 meters with a 5.7×28mm pistol. The device is available in several variations, including the Beretta 92F, a model widely used by US security forces, the Glock, SIG Sauer, and CZ. The mechanism can also mount various accessories such as detachable cameras, audio/video transmission kits, visible and IR lasers, tactical flashlights, suppressors, and can fire rubber bullets. A standard pistol version is available, along with a 40 mm grenade launcher. Because they are fitted with high-resolution digital cameras, any variant can also be used as a surveillance tool. All the models come with the same stock camera and 2.5-inch color LCD monitor, providing a video observation and sighting system with powerful transmission capability. The flashlight and camera let it operate in either day or night. A variety of optional interchangeable cameras, as well as a folding stock, are available, and a universal accessory rail is standard.

Future versions will be mountable on the US M16 rifle and a European joint assault weapon. The system can also be remotely emplaced and operated from behind camouflage, with a wire video-out connection sending images to a commander at a distance or saved to a two-hour flash memory chip attached to the gunstock.

Standard 
The standard CornerShot mounts a normal semi-automatic pistol in the front part of the weapon, with a remote linkage to the trigger mechanism in the rear part, it has a trigger pull of 21 newtons (4.7 lbf).  It is 820 millimetres (32.67 in) long, with a weight of 3.86 kilograms (8.5 lb).

40 mm grenade launcher 
The 40 mm grenade launcher is a breech-loading, single shot grenade launcher. Manually operated, it fires all 40mm grenades, less-lethal and non-lethal ammunition, and tear/irritant gas projectiles; spent cartridges are ejected for easier reloading. The same system is available in 37mm size for law enforcement agencies. The 40mm model has a rifling of 1:1.224, is 900mm long, and weighs 4.4 kg (9.5 lb). The muzzle velocity is 74.7 m/s (M-406 grenade). Its range for precision fire, at a single target, is 150 meters; and for area coverage, with fragmentation munitions, is 350 meters.

Assault Pistol Rifle 
The Assault Pistol Rifle (APR) mounts a custom pistol in the front part of the weapon to allow the use of rifle cartridges. It fires 5.56 mm ammunition. The APR pistol can be removed from the CornerShot frame.

Description 
In the standard version a pistol is mounted in the front end of the weapon, which bends horizontally at a mid-frame sixty-degree hinge. There is a digital camera and a flashlight attached to the barrel in the bayonet position. On the butt side of the hinge are the trigger, camera screen (which is on a horizontal hinge just like the mid-gun hinge but it is off of the left side of the gun), and controls for the camera and light.

Similar weapons
The periscope rifle was independently developed by a number of individuals as a response to the trench warfare of World War I; they were used by armies of several countries from 1914 onward. This earlier idea was simply a specialised "second" stock and trigger mechanism combined with a periscope to allow the shooter to remain safely within the trench and still aim and fire a rifle that was laid over the top of the trench parapet.

The Krummlauf (curved barrel) was an attachment for the Sturmgewehr 44 rifle, which was used by the Germans in World War II. It allowed the shooter to aim and fire around corners with its bent barrel and a periscope-style sight. A disadvantage of the device was its short life, due to the stress of firing.

China
China has made at least three CornerShot-like weapons to date: the HD-66, which is based on the CornerShot, and the CF-06. Both models were first unveiled at the 4th China Police Expo (CIPATE) and developed by the Chongqing Changfeng Machinery Co Ltd and Shanghai Sea Shield Technologies Company. According to Qing Shanseng, chief designer of the HD-66 and CF-06, both systems are indigenous and were not done based on the CornerShot.

The third one, known as the CS/LW9, was developed by the China Ordnance Industry Research Institute in 2005 in an attempt to do a similar system to the Israeli-made Cornershot. It has a handle at the bottom that can be used to turn the LW9 to the left or right.

The three systems use the QSZ-92 as the main pistol, although the LW9 also uses the NP22/34 pistols.

Pakistan

Iran
Iran has demonstrated a weapon that is a clone of the Israeli CornerShot.

As of 2016, there's no information on whether the Iranian military has fielded it.

South Korea
South Korea had publicly unveiled their own version of the CornerShot on March 23, 2010, created and developed by the Agency for Defense Development. The ADD had ₩350 million invested for research and development of their own CornerShot in September 2008 to 2015 Its functions are similar to the original version, with the exception of a laser target designator and a pixel sensor included to assist in locating hostile targets.

The CornerShot made in South Korea was developed by S&T Daewoo. It's unveiled in 2016 as the Korean Special-Purpose Weapon and mounts a S&T K5 pistol, although it can be used with other pistols. The K1A can be attached to the KSPW if necessary for additional firepower.

The KPSW has MIL-STD-1913 rails to allow attachment of optics and other tactical accessories.

India
Zen Technologies unveiled the ShootEdge at India International Security Expo 2015, New Delhi.

An Indian-made Cornershot weapon was first reported to be in development in 2014. A cornershot weapon system (CSWS) is designed and developed by the Defence Research and Development Organisation (DRDO). The CSWS is planned to have a pistol and 40mm GL variant. Development was reportedly done by 2019. It is made in aluminum alloy to make it light and durable. The CSWS's camera, laser, infrared illuminator, and torch are positioned in the front while the display, electronics, battery, and swivelling mechanism are located in the back. It can be equipped with the Glock 17/19 and the Indian-made 1A pistol. The DRDO version is being made in collaboration with Zen Technologies.

On March 26, 2022, the Central Reserve Police Force and the Jammu and Kashmir Police are in the process of adopting it after putting the CSWS through multiple tests.

Users

 
 : Used by the State Investigation and Protection Agency (SIPA) and the Federal Ministry of Internal Affairs Special Police Unit.
 : Beijing SWAT
 : Used by the Delhi and Punjab Police forces.
 : KOPASKA
 : Special Forces Corps (CFE)
 : Used by the Special Tasks Unit "Tiger".
 
 : The ROK Army Special Forces uses the Israeli model.
 : Singapore Army.
 : Special Forces, Gendarmerie Special Operations Command and Police Special Operation Department
 : Used by the Special Police Force (Cảnh sát Cơ động) and the Vietnamese Army's 113th Special Forces Brigade.

See also 
Periscope rifle
Krummlauf
POF Eye
HD66

Notes

Assault rifles
Police weapons
Weapons of Israel
Israeli inventions